Bianca Rowland is an American volleyball player, born  in Everett (Washington). She measures  and plays centre.

Clubs

Honours
German Cup
 Finalist : 2014.

Notes and references

See also 

 United States women's national volleyball team

External links
 Profile at the CEV site
  Official site of the club 

American women's volleyball players
1990 births
Living people
Sportspeople from Everett, Washington
Washington Huskies women's volleyball players